The 1981 World Figure Skating Championships, was 71st edition of World Figure Skating Championship were held in Hartford, Connecticut, United States from March 3 to 8. At the event, sanctioned by the International Skating Union, medals were awarded in men's singles, ladies' singles, pair skating, and ice dancing.

The ISU Representative was Olaf Poulsen and the ISU Technical Delegate was Josef Dědič.

The judging system was modified since 1980. For the singles events, the short program was worth 20% and the free skating 50% while the value of compulsory figures was reduced to 30% of the final result. The rank in each category was multiplied with a factor and these three numbers were added to the total score. The factor for the compulsory figures was 0.6, for the short program 0.4 and for the free skating 1.0. The rank within these three categories were judged according to the 6.0-judging system. In pairs, the short program had the factor 0.4 and the free skating 1.0. The ranks within the two pair categories were also judged according to the 6.0-judging system.

Medal tables

Medalists

Medals by country

Results

Men

Referee:
 Donald H. Gilchrist 

Assistant Referee:
 Elemér Terták 

Judges:
 Walburga Grimm 
 Junko Hiramatsu 
 Monique Georgelin 
 Gerhard Frey 
 Maria Zuchowicz 
 Sergei Kononykhin 
 Linda Petersen 
 Hugh C. Graham jr. 
 Geoffrey Yates 

Substitute judge:
 Bojan Lipovšćak

Ladies

Referee:
 Sonia Bianchetti 

Assistant Referee:
 Charles U. Foster 

Judges:
 Tjaša Andrée 
 Ludwig Gassner 
 Karl-David Runeskog 
 Jane Sullivan 
 Kuniko Ueno 
 Helga von Wiecki 
 Marie Lundmark 
 Eugen Romminger 
 David Dore 

Substitute judge:
 Pamela Davis

Pairs

Referee:
 Benjamin T. Wright 

Assistant Referee:
 Martin Felsenreich 

Judges:
 Maya Reinhart 
 Jacqueline Kendall-Baker 
 Walburga Grimm 
 Dorothy MacLeod 
 Pamela Davis 
 Liudmila Kubashevskaya 
 Maria Zuchowicz 
 E. Newbold Black IV. 
 Eugen Romminger 

Substitute judge:
 Junko Hiramatsu

Ice dancing

Sources
 Result list provided by the ISU

World Figure Skating Championships
World Figure Skating Championships
World Figure Skating Championships
International figure skating competitions hosted by the United States
Sports competitions in Hartford, Connecticut
20th century in Hartford, Connecticut
World Figure Skating Championship
World Figure Skating Championship